Organtino di Mariano Bisconti (active 1529 - 1564) was an Italian painter of the Renaissance period active in Perugia.

He painted the altarpiece of Santa Margherita in Perugia.  He was a pupil of Giovanni Battista Caporali, and worked with him in the church of San Pietro in Perugia. Organtino also worked with Lattanzio Pagani.

References

16th-century Italian painters
Italian male painters
Italian Renaissance painters
1529 births
1564 deaths
Umbrian painters